The  is a railway line in Japan operated by Keihan Electric Railway. The line runs between Sanjō Station in Kyoto and Yodoyabashi Station in Osaka. There are through services to the Keihan Ōtō Line and the Keihan Nakanoshima Line. Trains from Kyoto to Osaka are treated as "down" trains, and from Osaka to Kyoto as "up" trains.

Train services
As of March 2022, the following services are operated.
 (Ln)
All cars reserved seating. Trains run "down" in the morning, and "up" in the evening. Weekdays Only.
 (RLE)
Premium car is reserved seating only
 (LE)
Premium car is reserved seating only
 (CRE) - "down" trains only, on weekday mornings
 (RE) - premium car is reserved seating

 (ME) - "up" trains only (Discontinued in 7/2021)

A train departs from Yodoyabashi for Kuzuha at 0:20 a.m. and passes Moriguchishi and Hirakata-kōen.
 (Ex)
 (CSbE) - "down" trains only, on weekday mornings
Trains are operated from Demachiyanagi, Kuzuha, Hirakatashi to Yodoyabashi or Nakanoshima in the morning and pass Moriguchishi.
 (SbE)
 (SmE)

 Trains stop at all stations.

Operation in non-rush hours per hour
Limited express: 6 round trips between Yodoyabashi and Demachiyanagi
Express: 3 round trips between Yodoyabashi and Kuzuha
Sub. express: 3 round trips between Yodoyabashi and Demachiyanagi
Local: 6 round trips between Nakanoshima and Kayashima, of which 3 extend to Demachiyanagi

Stations

S: Trains stop.
s: limited stop
|, ↑, ↓: Trains pass.
↑, ↓: Only one direction.
▼: Boarding only in "up" oirection.
▲: Boarding only in "down" oirection.
(M): Stations using melodies composed by musician Minoru Mukaiya in train departure announcements.
For train abbreviations, see above.

Rolling stock

History
The Temmabashi to Kiyomizu-Gojo section opened as dual track, electrified at 1,500 V DC, in 1910, and was extended to Sanjo in 1915. The Temmabashi to Yodoyabashi section opened in 1963.

The section between Kōrien Station and Hirakata-kōen Station is set to undergo a grade separation process beginning in September 2022. Preliminary works such as land acquisition had already been in progress since 2013. The project aims to eliminate 21 level crossings in the affected section, some of which are closed for up to 40 minutes per hour during the morning and afternoon rush hour. Work is expected to finish by 2027 with the transition to the elevated tracks happening by 2028.

External links
 Keihan Nakanoshima Line website

See also
 List of railway lines in Japan

References
This article incorporates material from the corresponding article in the Japanese Wikipedia.

Railway lines opened in 1929
Lines of Keihan Electric Railway
Rail transport in Osaka Prefecture
Rail transport in Kyoto Prefecture
Railway lines opened in 2008
Standard gauge railways in Japan